Coventry, England is an ethnically and culturally diverse city. It is the fifteenth most populous city in the United Kingdom.

Population

Coventry's total population, according to the 2011 UK census, was 316,960. The population density was 3,408 people per square km.

Ethnicity

The following table shows the ethnic group of respondents in the 1991, 2001, 2011 and 2021 censuses in Coventry. Coventry has declined from a 88.1% White overall city to one with less than two-thirds of its population. Asian British people have risen from around 1 in 10 (9.7%) to around nearly 1 in 5 (18.5). Black British people have had a explosive growth, coming primarily from the increasing African population, they have risen from 1.6% to 8.9% from 1991 to 2021. The Mixed and Other ethnicities have also increased as well.

Notes for table above

Ethnicity of school pupils

Coventry's schools are in a majority-minority state with no-overall ethnic majority present, however of broad multi-ethnic groups, Whites make up the majority with 54.3% of the population.

Languages

The most common main languages spoken in Coventry according to the 2011 census are shown below.

Religion

The following table shows the religion of respondents in the 2001 and 2011 censuses in Coventry.

See also

Demography of the West Midlands
Demography of the United Kingdom
Demography of England
Demography of London
Demography of Birmingham
Demography of Greater Manchester
List of English cities by population
List of English districts by population
List of English districts and their ethnic composition
List of English districts by area
List of English districts by population density

References

Coventry
Coventry